Torrenueva is a municipality located in the province of Ciudad Real, Castile-La Mancha, Spain. It has a population of 2,988 (2014).

Municipalities in the Province of Ciudad Real